Thitarodes cingulatus is a species of moth of the family Hepialidae. It was described by Yang and Zhang in 1995, and is known from Gansu, China.

References

External links
Hepialidae genera

Moths described in 1995
Hepialidae